talech is an American cloud-based software company based in Palo Alto, California. The company makes software that is at the centre of point of sale systems for restaurants, bars, retail outlets and professional services. The software runs on the iOS and Android operating systems and functions on iPads and a variety of Android hardware devices.

talech was established in 2012 by Irv Henderson and Leo Jiang who continue to perform the roles of CEO and CTO within the company. In September 2019, talech was acquired by US Bancorp. The company also maintains offices in Scottsdale, Arizona, Dublin, Ireland and Kaunas, Lithuania.

History 
talech was founded in 2012 by Irv Henderson and Leo Jiang who had worked together previously at Yahoo. The company grew steadily, focusing initially on the North American market where they acquired customers through referral partnerships with Chase, Bank of America Merchant Services, Elavon and USA E-pay. In 2014, the company opened an office in Dublin to serve the European market where they operate referral partnerships with Bank of Ireland Payment Acceptance, AIB Merchant Services and Elavon Europe. 

In September 2019, the company was acquired by US Bancorp.

Products and hardware 
talech provides software that allows businesses to manage multiple operational tasks – such as order management, inventory and staff reporting, customer management, business insights and payments processing – in a single, integrated point-of-sale system. talech serves over 8,000 restaurants and bars, retailers and professional services companies representing $2.3 billion in processing volume.

talech operates on the iPad family of devices where it works with a variety of hardware options such as cash drawers, barcode scanners, digital weighing scales, Epson and Star Micronics printers and Ingenico card readers. It also works on Android powered devices such as the Poynt and Ingenico-built, Moby line of point of sale solutions.

As a Saas provider, talech's point of sale is available through starter, standard and premium packages with each tier enabling access to a greater number of features and functionality.

References

External links
Official website

Point of sale companies
Software companies based in California
U.S. Bancorp
American companies established in 2012
Companies based in Palo Alto, California